The Latin Grammy Awards are awarded in a series of categories, each of which isolate a specific contribution to Latin music. The standard awards list nominees in each category from which a winner is selected. These categories have been added and removed over time.

General Field
The General Field consists of four standard awards representing the best over-all achievements in performance, production, and songwriting in Spanish and Portuguese languages:
Record of the Year is awarded to the performer and the production team of a single song.
Album of the Year is awarded to the performer and the production team of a full album.
Song of the Year is awarded to the writer(s)/composer(s) of a single song.
Best New Artist is awarded to an artist without reference to a song or album.

Genre-specific fields

Pop
Best Pop Vocal Album
Best Traditional Pop Vocal Album
Best Pop Song

Previously awarded:
Best Female Pop Vocal Album
Best Male Pop Vocal Album
Best Pop Album by a Duo or Group with Vocals
Best Contemporary Pop Vocal Album

Urban
Best Urban Fusion/Performance
Best Reggaeton Performance
Best Urban Music Album
Best Rap/Hip Hop Song
Best Urban Song

Rock
Best Rock Album
Best Rock Song
Best Pop/Rock Album
Best Pop/Rock Song

Previously awarded:
Best Rock Solo Vocal Album
Best Rock Vocal Album, Duo or Group

Alternative
Best Alternative Music Album
Best Alternative Song

Tropical
Best Salsa Album
Best Cumbia/Vallenato Album
Best Merengue/Bachata Album
Best Contemporary Tropical/Tropical Fusion Album
Best Traditional Tropical Album
Best Tropical Song

Previously awarded:
Best Tropical Fusion Album

Singer-Songwriter
Best Singer-Songwriter Album

Regional Mexican
Best Ranchero/Mariachi Album
Best Banda Album
Best Tejano Album
Best Norteño Album
Best Regional Mexican Song

Previously awarded:
Best Grupero Album

Instrumental
Best Instrumental Album

Traditional
Best Folk Album
Best Tango Album
Best Flamenco Album

Jazz
Best Latin Jazz Album

Christian
Best Christian Album (Spanish Language)
Best Christian Album (Portuguese Language)

Portuguese Language 
Best Portuguese Language Contemporary Pop Album
Best Portuguese Language Rock or Alternative Album
Best Samba/Pagode Album
Best MPB Album
Best Sertaneja Music Album
Best Portuguese Language Roots Album
Best Portuguese Language Song

Previously awarded:
Best Romantic Music Album

Note: The field was originally called "Brazilian" before it was changed to "Portuguese Language" in 2016.

Children's
Best Latin Children’s Album

Classical
Best Classical Album
Best Classical Contemporary Composition

Arrangement
Best Arrangement

Recording Package
Best Recording Package

Production
Best Engineered Album
Producer of the Year

Music video
Best Short Form Music Video
Best Long Form Music Video

Special awards
There are special awards which are awarded without nominations, typically for achievements of longer than the past year, which the standard awards apply to:

Person of the Year is a Special Merit Award presented to an individual who has had a significant effect on Latin music and has taken part in extensive philanthropy.
Lifetime Achievement Award: is a Special Merit Award presented to performers who have made creative contributions of outstanding artistic significance to the field of recording during their careers.
Trustees Awards: is a Special Merit Award presented to individuals who have made significant contributions, other than performance, to the field of recording during their careers.
Hall of Fame Award  honors recordings that are at least twenty-five years old that have made significant contributions

References
The Latin GRAMMY Award Categories
The Latin GRAMMY Award Category Guidelines
The Latin GRAMMY Special Awards

.
Music-related lists
 
American music-related lists